Kjell Kleppe (1934-1988) was a Norwegian biochemist and molecular biologist who was a pioneer in the PCR technique and built the first laboratory in the country for bio and gene technology.
Kjell Kleppe earned a B.S. degree from the University of Oslo (1955-1958) and a Ph.D. in enzymology from the University of Nebraska, USA (1958-1963). Kleppe conducted research at many prestigious universities, including Cambridge and Massachusetts Institute of Technology (MIT), and in 1966, he joined the University of Bergen, where he founded Felleslaboratorium for bioteknologi (FLB), the first gene technology laboratory in Norway with Professor Curt Endresen. He became a member of the European Molecular Biology Organization (EMBO) and Royal Norwegian Society of Sciences and Letters (DKNVS) in 1984.

During his postdoctoral career in the United States, he put forward the idea of the polymerase chain reaction (PCR). Kleppe discovered the concepts for PCR while working in the laboratory of 1968 Nobel Prize winner, Har Gobind Khorana at the University of Wisconsin-Madison. Two years after he published the founding principles of PCR, Kleppe and Khorana published a "process called repair replication for synthesizing short DNA duplexes and single-stranded DNA by polymerases." Because of his initial discoveries and ideas, PCR can now be applied to forensics, genetics, and diagnostics. Recently, its most notable use is in connection to COVID-19 diagnostics, as it is able to identify bacteria and viruses.

References

1934 births
1988 deaths
Norwegian biochemists
Royal Norwegian Society of Sciences and Letters